The 1997–98 Temple Owls men's basketball team represented Temple University as a member of the Atlantic 10 Conference during the 1997–98 NCAA Division I men's basketball season. The team was led by head coach John Chaney and played their home games at the newly opened Liacouras Center in Philadelphia, Pennsylvania. The Owls won the Atlantic 10 regular season title, but fell in the semifinals of the Atlantic 10 Tournament. The team received an at-large bid to the NCAA tournament as No. 7 seed in the West region. Temple lost to No. 10 seed West Virginia, 82–52, in the opening round. Temple finished with a record of 21–9 (13–3 A-10).

Roster

Schedule and results 

|-
!colspan=9 style=| Regular Season

|-
!colspan=9 style=| Atlantic 10 Tournament

|-
!colspan=9 style=| NCAA Tournament

Rankings

References 

Temple Owls men's basketball seasons
Temple
Temple
Temple
Temple